Aleksandar Magovac (born 9 February 1991) is a Slovenian professional ice hockey player who currently plays professionally in Slovenia for HK Olimpija of the ICE Hockey League (ICEHL).

Career statistics

Regular season and playoffs

International

References

External links

 

1991 births
Living people
HC Nové Zámky players
HK Poprad players
Slovenian ice hockey defencemen
Sportspeople from Jesenice, Jesenice
Slovenian expatriate sportspeople in the Czech Republic
Slovenian expatriate sportspeople in Austria
Slovenian expatriate sportspeople in Slovakia
Slovenian expatriate sportspeople in France
Slovenian expatriate ice hockey people
Expatriate ice hockey players in the Czech Republic
Expatriate ice hockey players in Slovakia
Expatriate ice hockey players in France
Expatriate ice hockey players in Austria
HK Acroni Jesenice players
HK Olimpija players
Orli Znojmo players
Brûleurs de Loups players
HDD Jesenice players
EK Zell am See players